Letters From Rifka is a children's historical novel by Karen Hesse, published by Holt in 1992. It features a Jewish family's emigration from Russia in 1919, to Belgium and ultimately to the U.S., from the perspective of daughter Rifka, based on the personal account by Hesse's great-aunt Lucille Avrutin.

Hesse and Letters won the 2016 Phoenix Award from the Children's Literature Association, recognizing the best children's book published twenty years earlier that did not win a major award. Among contemporary honors it won the 1993 National Jewish Book Award in category Children's Literature.

The protagonist's name, Rifka, is the East European Jewish version of Rebecca (Rivká in Modern Israeli Hebrew).

Plot 
During the Russian Civil War of 1919, Rifka and her family must flee Russia because the Russian army is after one of her brothers for leaving the army; the penalty for that is death for the entire family. She tells her story in a series of letters to a cousin named Tovah who remains behind in Russia, written in the blank spaces of an edition of Pushkin's poetry. Rifka, her parents, and her brothers, Nathan and Saul (who was abusive towards her in the past but changed throughout the course of the novel), escape Russia, hoping to join the three older sons who have been living in America. Along the way, they face many obstacles such as cruel officials, her mom, dad and older brother all catch typhus. They suffer through hunger, theft, and Rifka gets a skin disease, ringworm, which forces her to stay behind in Belgium while her family travels to America. In Belgium people are kind to Jews and she is able to recover from her illness. Once she recovers she can leave Belgium to travel to America to meet her family. She travels to America by a large ship where she befriends and develops romantic feelings for Pieter, a sailor. During the voyage, a dangerous storm occurs, killing Pieter. She arrives to Ellis island where she learns that her skin disease has returned and she can't enter America yet. While she is detained at Ellis Island, she finds she has a talent for nursing others to health. On Ellis island Rifka meets a new friend named Ilya, but he first does not talk to her nor will he eat her LIVA, so everyone thinks he's a simpleton. Once Rifka becomes better friends with him, she discovers that he is very smart. She helps him understand that his uncle is not cruel and wants him to come to America because he loves Ilya, and Ilya reads from Rifka's Pushkin poetry book. He passes the "Test" and makes it to America. Rifka gets over her ringworm, and gets to America to be with her family.

Reception
Kirkus Reviews called it "an unforgettable picture of immigrant courage, ingenuity, and perseverance." while Publishers Weekly wrote "Hesse's vivacious tale colorfully and convincingly refreshes the immigrant experience."

References

External links 
 
 Formats and editions of Letters from Rifka at WorldCat
 Karen Hesse at Macmillan US

1992 American novels
American young adult novels
Children's historical novels
Epistolary novels
Jewish American novels
Fiction set in 1919
Henry Holt and Company books
1992 children's books
Novels about immigration to the United States
Fictional Russian Jews